Imperial Valley Geothermal Project is a complex of eleven geothermal power stations located in the Salton Sea Geothermal Field, along the southeastern shore of the Salton Sea in the Imperial Valley of California. It is the second largest geothermal field in the United States after The Geysers in Northern California.

Description 

Parts of Imperial Valley lie atop the Salton Sea Geothermal Field, a region of high geothermal energy with an estimated 2,950 MW of geothermal potential. Of that total, 2250 MW are currently developable, while the remaining 700 MW would become available as the Salton Sea (a saline lake) dries up. About 403 MW is generated by the existing power plants, ten of which are owned by CalEnergy and one by EnergySource.

Geothermal power and lithium extraction
In 2016, the Australian firm Controlled Thermal Resources (CTR) announced plans to build a 140 MW geothermal power plant and a lithium extraction facility capable of producing 15,000 tons (13,600 tonnes) by 2023 and 75,000 tons (68,000 tonnes) by 2027. The company hopes to create a major new domestic source of the mineral, which is a key ingredient used in batteries for electric cars and energy storage. The project is expected to be operational by 2023. General Motors announced a strategic partnership  with CTR in 2021 to secure a local supply of lithium. The majority of the battery-grade lithium hydroxide and carbonate for the Ultium battery will come from this plant.

Geothermal power stations
This is a table of all constituent geothermal power stations.

See also

 List of geothermal power stations in the United States
 List of power stations in California

References

External links

Buildings and structures in Imperial County, California
Geothermal power stations in California